Bringing Down the House may refer to:

 Bringing Down the House (book), a 2003 book by Ben Mezrich
 Bringing Down the House (film), a 2003 American comedy
 Bringing Down the House (soundtrack), a soundtrack album from the film
 "Bringing Down the House" (The Apprentice), an episode of the U.S. version of The Apprentice
 "Bringing Down the House", an episode of Supa Strikas
 Bringing Down the House, a 2009 NZWPW New Zealand Tag Team Championship event

See also
 Bringing Down the Horse, a 1996 album by The Wallflowers
 Burning Down the House (disambiguation)